Jumbles Country Park is a country park in Bolton, Greater Manchester. It lies on the southern edge of the West Pennine Moors. It was opened on 11 March 1971 by Queen Elizabeth II. The park is now owned and managed by United Utilities.

References

Country parks in Greater Manchester
West Pennine Moors
Tourist attractions in the Metropolitan Borough of Bolton